OHC may stand for:

 Overhead camshaft
 Ocean heat content
 Order of the Holy Cross, a monastic community
 Outer hair cell, a vertebrate body cell
 Office for Humanities Communication, co-publisher of Humanist
 Ontario Housing Corporation
 Organizational health center, an industrial organization in occupational health psychology
 Oxford Harmonic Choir
 Open House Chicago, an annual architecture festival hosted by the Chicago Architecture Foundation

See also
 OHCS, Oregon Housing and Community Services Department
 POHC, reporting mark for the Pittsburgh and Ohio Central Railroad